Hendrik "Henk" Numan (13 June 1955 – 26 April 2018) was a judoka from the Netherlands, who won the bronze medal in half-heavyweight division (-95 kg) at the 1980 Summer Olympics in Moscow. His only loss at that tournament was against the later champion Robert Van De Walle from Belgium. A year earlier he won a bronze medal at the 1979 World Judo Championships. In 1992, he also competed in Japanese professional wrestling for Fighting Network RINGS as a part of Chris Dolman's team.

Numan died at the age of 62 on 26 April 2018. No cause of death was publicly released. However, in an interview with Dutch wrestling coach Bert Kops jr., published a few weeks later, it was revealed that Numan had committed suicide.

References

1955 births
2018 deaths
Dutch male judoka
Judoka at the 1980 Summer Olympics
Olympic bronze medalists for the Netherlands
Olympic judoka of the Netherlands
Olympic medalists in judo
Sportspeople from Amsterdam
Medalists at the 1980 Summer Olympics
2018 suicides
20th-century Dutch people
21st-century Dutch people